Crow Creek Tribal School (CCTS) is a tribal K-12 school in Stephan, South Dakota, on the Hunkpati Sioux Reservation. It is associated with the Bureau of Indian Education (BIE), and covers grades K-12.  it had about 600 students.

The school has a dormitory facility for students in grades 7-12, including those who live in any geographic distance from the school.

History
Prior to losing its gymnasium the school had about 300 students, but after the gymnasium was decommissioned enrollment declined.

In 2003 the dormitory burned down. The building was not insured although the objects inside were.

In Summer 2008 enrollment was 120. In 2008, multiple former employees were sentenced and/or awaiting sentencing for federal criminal charges, causing turmoil at the school. The school was scheduled to get a gymnasium in 2009.

Student body
The school enrolls students from Fort Thompson and from Native American reservations in South Dakota and other states.

References

External links
 Crow Creek Tribal School (cctribalschools.org)
 Crow Creek Tribal School (crowcreek.k12.sd.us)

Native American boarding schools
Public boarding schools in the United States
Boarding schools in South Dakota
Hyde County, South Dakota
Public middle schools in South Dakota
Public high schools in South Dakota
Public K-12 schools in the United States